Space radio system (also: space system) is – according to article 1.110 of the International Telecommunication Union's (ITU) ITU Radio Regulations (RR) – defined as «Any group of cooperating earth stations and/or space stations employing space radiocommunication for specific purposes.»

Each system shall be classified by the service in which it operates permanently or temporarily.

See also

References / sources 

 International Telecommunication Union (ITU)

Radio stations and systems ITU